Glitter Hole is a "DIY drag collective" from Ireland, who have performed at Dublin Fringe Festival.

They perform "Drag Story Time" events for children, such as at Party in the Park as part of the International Literature Festival Dublin., upon which they were recommended to Dún Laoghaire–Rathdown Libraries. But in April 2019, the scheduled event in Deansgrange Library and was cancelled by Dún Laoghaire–Rathdown County Council. Initially DLR claimed the event was "not age-appropriate", prompting claims of homophobia, then later claiming the event was cancelled due to "significant concern at the high level of degrading, inappropriate comments on social media about the performers and library staff."

The cancellation renewed conversations about Ireland's censorship laws.

See also 
 LGBT rights in the Republic of Ireland

References

External links 
 Glitter Hole Twitter account

LGBT culture in Ireland
Drag groups
Politics of Dún Laoghaire–Rathdown
Controversies in Ireland